Seaforth is a suburb of Northern Sydney, in the state of New South Wales, Australia. Seaforth is located 12 kilometres north-east of the Sydney central business district in the local government area of Northern Beaches Council and is part of the Northern Beaches region.

Seaforth overlooks Middle Harbour and is linked south to Mosman by the Spit Bridge. To the west, Seaforth overlooks Sugarloaf Bay across to the suburbs of Northbridge, Castlecrag and Castle Cove. The Garigal National Park sits on the northern border.

History
Seaforth was named after Loch Seaforth and Seaforth Island in Scotland. The land in this area was once owned by Henry Halloran, who subdivided it in 1906.

The Seaforth library was built in 1887 and protected by heritage listing by Manly Council in 1995. It stands outside the former Seaforth TAFE. Seaforth celebrated its centenary on Sunday 12 November 2006 with a historical display in the town centre.

Commercial area
The Seaforth shopping district is located off Sydney Road and offers a wide variety of services, including niche market products. It is also home to Balgowlah RSL Memorial Club.

Demographics

At the 2016 census, the suburb of Seaforth recorded a population of 7,139.  Of these: 
 There are more families with young children than typical.  While the median age was 40 years, compared to the national median of 38 years, children aged under 15 years made up 25.5% of the population (national average is 18.7%) and people aged 65 years and over made up 12.8% of the population (national average is 15.8%).
 64.8% of people were born in Australia. The most common countries of birth were England 10.4%, New Zealand 2.3%, China 1.9% and South Africa 1.7%.
 82.4% of people only spoke English at home. Other languages spoken at home included Mandarin at 2.2%.
 The most common responses for religion were No Religion 34.4%, Catholic 26.9% and Anglican 18.7%
 The median household weekly income was $3,384, compared to the national median of $1,438.
 Separate houses made up the great majority (85.9%) of residences, 9.0% were semi-detached and 4.7% were flats, units or apartments. The average household size was 3.2 people.

Schools
Seaforth is home to Seaforth Public School. There is currently an aged care facility where a TAFE used to be.

References

External links

  

Suburbs of Sydney
Northern Beaches Council